Diana Haller (born 11 November 1986) is a Croatian mezzo-soprano and active in opera, oratorio, and recital. She was named "Nachwuchssängerin des Jahres 2013" (Young singer of the year 2013) by the magazine Opernwelt.

Haller was born in Rijeka (Croatia), in a family of Croatian and Italian background. She grew up in an artistic family being a great-granddaughter of the pianist Emilia Haller, granddaughter of the painter Antun Haller, and nephew of the musicians Roberto Haller and his wife Ingrid Haller.

References

Operatic mezzo-sopranos
21st-century Croatian women opera singers
Living people
1986 births